The 2023 European Karate Championships is the 58th edition of the European Karate Championships and 5th European Para Karate Championships, will held in Guadalajara, Spain from 25 to 29 March 2023.

Medalists

Men

Women

Participating nations 
548 athletes from 47 countries participated:

  (5)
  (1)
  (5)
  (12)
  (18)
  (7)
  (18)
  (8)
  (26)
  (11)
  (5)
  (11)
  (16)
  (23)
  (4)
  (9)
  (25)
  (5)
  (16)
  (14)
  (21)
  (1)
  (10)
  (6)
  (21)
  (7)
  (7)
  (3)
  (4)
  (5)
  (2)
  (15)
  (22)
  (12)
  (3)
  (15)
  (17)
  (12)
  (9)
  (1)
  (18)
  (15)
  (13)
  (9)
  (11)
  (27)
  (22)
 Refugee Karate Team (1)

Para-Karate

References

External links
 World Karate Federation

European Championships, 2019
2023 in Spanish sport
2023
International karate competitions hosted by Spain
Karate competitions in Spain
Sport in Guadalajara, Spain
European Karate Championships